New rhetorics is an interdisciplinary field approaching for the broadening of classical rhetorical canon.

Overview
The New Rhetoric is a result of various efforts of bringing back rhetorics from the marginal status it attained by its image and 'negative connotations of "political lies, corporate spin, long list of Greek and Roman terms for patterns of expression no one knowingly uses, purple prose, boiler-plate arrangement schemas, unimaginative reproductions of bullshit and so on" if not to its previous place of a discipline "associated with social and intellectual prestige" then at least to the level of the other contemporary fields in the social, cultural and linguistic studies. Notoriously the field emerged after the work of Chaïm Perelman and Lucie Olbrechts-Tyteca in their book The New Rhetoric (1969) but both the notion and the idea for the need of "new" rhetoric, different from the "old" one can be traced to the works of Kenneth Burke - A Rhetoric of Motives (1950) and Rhetoric - Old and New (1967).

What helped the emergence of New rhetoric was the ideas of the epistemic status of rhetoric, the notion of a clearly definable rhetorical core, and others. An attempt to apply the New Rhetoric as a social philosophy was made by the Polish philosopher Mieczysław Maneli in his 1994 book Perelman's New Rhetoric as Philosophy and Methodology for the Next Century. Maneli wrote: "The New Rhetoric is modern humanism. The struggle for humanism never ends. The most essential features to a humanistic approach to life are: individuals should be given the chance to develop their personal talents and energies, they should be able to be creative and become happy...Their essence and value are creativity and self-determination...Once the New Rhetoric took as its basic proposition that nothing is absolutely good or sacred except human dignity, one must constantly search for new values, for better forms, and ways of life. There are three specific areas that is especially important for modern humanism: social and individual justice, freedom from oppression with a genuine opportunity for a decent life; and tolerance and privacy". 

New rhetorics attempts to preserve the original field but it also has tense relationship with it. For example, New Rhetoric attempts to break up with the formalistic and logocentric (i.e. patriarchal) Neo-Aristotelian analysis in favour of interplay between text and context, but according to DeGenaro it does not succeed to place itself outside the "Western-patriarchal" tradition with being unable to departure from "elite backgrounds and scopes of study" to a diversity of voices, topics, etc. This probably makes New Rhetoric rather a ground for the postmodern rhetoric which "puts into question the identities of the speaker, the audience, and the messages that pass between them" with evaluating the intersubjective philosophy because of the idea inherently accepted in postmodernistic philosophy that "differences cannot be overcome, in Hegelian fashion, by cancelling them under a higher-order synthesis, but must be eroded or defaced in the course of traversing them."

References

Rhetoric
Structuralism
Formalism (philosophy)